Alberto Ramírez can refer to:

 Alberto Ramírez (Mexican footballer)
 Alberto Ramírez (footballer, born 1941)
 Alberto Ramírez (footballer, born 1968)